

List of Ambassadors

Yossi Avni-Levy 2019 - 
Amir Maimon 2015 - 2019
Gary Koren 2003 until 2006.

References

Lithuania
Israel